Asura marginata is a moth of the family Erebidae. It is found in India.

References

marginata
Moths described in 1864
Moths of Asia